Marcus Egnatius Rufus (d. 19 BCE in Rome) was a Roman senator and politician at the time of Augustus.

In 22 BCE he served as an aedile and became very popular with the residents of Rome by setting up a private fire brigade. In contrast to earlier enterprises of this kind, which, like the fire brigade of Marcus Licinius Crassus, only worked for payment, Egnatius made the 600 slaves he financed available free of charge to fight fires. Because of the numerous fires in the city he gained great popularity and was elected praetor as early as 21 BCE without observing the usual waiting period.

In 19 BCE he stood for election as consul, but the consul Gaius Sentius Saturninus prevented this, probably at the instigation of Augustus. Egnatius was accused of conspiring against Augustus. Seneca includes him in the multiple conspiracy and assassination attempts against Augustus. The Senate passed the senatus consultum ultimum, an emergency measure suspending usual procedures, for the last time we know of and Egnatius was imprisoned and executed with some of his followers.  Karl-Wilhelm Weeber claims that Augustus saw Egnatius as a political competitor who could have become dangerous to the princeps because of his popularity with the people. After Egnatius' death, Augustus set up his own fire brigade, which also consisted of 600 slaves, and later, in 7 or 6 BCE the fire brigade was enlarged, now consisting of 3,500 freedmen, the vigiles, who were divided into seven cohorts of 500 men each and made subordinate to a praefectus vigilum. In about 200 CE their number was doubled to 7000 men.

Sources
 Ph. Badot: A propos de la conspiration de M. Egnatius Rufus. In: Latomus. 32, 1977, p. 606–615.

References 

1st-century BC Romans
Senators of the Roman Empire
19 BC deaths
Egnatii
Roman aediles
1st-century BC Roman praetors